William Humphreys Dayas (12 September 1863, New York – 3 May 1903, Manchester) was an American pianist, pedagogue and composer, one of the last pupils of Franz Liszt. Dayas lost his parents at an early age. He studied organ and composition and moved to Germany in 1881. After studies with Liszt, he taught at European conservatoires, including Helsinki (1890–1893), where his daughter, the pianist and pedagogue Karin Dayas (1892–1971) was born. After that he worked as a piano teacher in Germany, New York and finally as a professor at Royal Manchester College of Music. He composed piano pieces.

William Dayas was married to Margaret (Margarethe) Vocke, a pupil of Liszt, in 1891.

Sources

Notes

External links
 McMaster University Libraries: Dayas, W. H.
 

1863 births
1903 deaths
19th-century classical composers
19th-century American composers
19th-century classical pianists
19th-century American pianists
19th-century American male musicians
American classical composers
American male classical composers
American classical pianists
American male classical pianists
Piano pedagogues
Academics of the Royal Northern College of Music
Musicians from New York City
Classical musicians from New York (state)
American expatriates in the United Kingdom